Longarm may refer to:
Longarm (book series), an adult western book series
Longarm (film), a 1988 western television film loosely based on the book series
Longarm (quilting), a type of sewing machine
Long gun, a category of firearm
Long-arm jurisdiction, a legal term
Long Arm (G.I. Joe), a G.I. Joe character
P.J. "LongArm" O'Malley, a character from COPS (animated TV series)
The Long ARM of Gil Hamilton, science fiction short story collection by Larry Niven featuring Gil Hamilton
Nelly Longarms, character in English folklore